The Porticus Argonautarum (portico of the Argonauts) (also known as the Portico of Agrippa) was an ancient structure in Rome.

The building was located in the Saepta Julia, a large square in the Campus Martius used for public comitia (assemblies). The square, a large free space surrounded by porticoes, was finished by Marcus Vipsanius Agrippa, admiral and friend  of emperor Augustus, in 27 BC. The portico of the Argonauts was added in 25 BC, to commemorate Agrippa's naval victories in 31 BC: it took its name from its decorations, which depicted the mythological expedition of Jason.

Studies of the Forma Urbis (an ancient detailed plan of Rome) have located the portico in what is now Via della Minerva, near the basilica of Santa Maria sopra Minerva.

A brickwork wall preserved along the eastern side of the Pantheon has been assigned to the  Porticus Argonautarum.

Notes

External links
Page at ciceronline 

27 BC
Buildings and structures completed in the 1st century BC
Ancient Roman buildings and structures in Rome
Augustan building projects
Colonnades